Year 208 (CCVIII) was a leap year starting on Friday (link will display the full calendar) of the Julian calendar. At the time, it was known as the Year of the Consulship of Aurelius and Geta (or, less frequently, year 961 Ab urbe condita). The denomination 208 for this year has been used since the early medieval period, when the Anno Domini calendar era became the prevalent method in Europe for naming years.

Events 
 By place 
 China 

 Spring – Battle of Jiangxia: Sun Quan defeats Huang Zu.
 October
 Warlord Cao Cao marches south with his army, and captures the enemy fleet at Jiangling.
  Battle of Changban: Warlord Liu Bei escapes from Cao Cao.
 December 10 – Cao Cao writes Duǎn Ge Xíng.
 Winter – Zhou Yu and Liu Bei defeat Cao Cao at the Battle of Red Cliffs; along with the Battle of Yamen and Battle of Lake Poyang. This is one of the largest naval battles in China's history.

 Parthia 
 King Vologases VI succeeds his father Vologases V to the throne. His brother Artabanus V begins a rebellion against him in the Parthian Empire. 
 Ardashir I, ruler of Istakhr (Persia), revolts against his brother and founds the Sassanid Dynasty.

Roman Empire 
 Marcus Aurelius Antoninus Augustus and his brother Publius Septimius Geta Caesar become Roman Consuls.
 Emperor Septimius Severus leads an expedition (20,000 men) into Britannia, crosses Hadrian's Wall and moves through eastern Scotland. The Roman army pushes the Caledonians back to the River Tay and Severus signs a peace treaty. He repairs the Antonine Wall (his repairs are sometimes called the Severan Wall).
 Britain is divided: in the north, Lower Britain (Britannia Inferior) is administered from the fortress at Eburacum (modern York), and in the south, Upper Britain (Britannia Superior) is controlled by the legions at Deva Victrix (Chester) and Isca Augusta (Caerleon) with its capital at Londinium (London).

Births 
 Cao Li, Chinese imperial prince (d. 229)
 Diadumenian, Roman emperor (d. 218)
 Sima Shi, Chinese general and regent (d. 255)
 Severus Alexander, Roman emperor (d. 235)

Deaths 
 Cao Chong (or Cangshu), Chinese warlord (b. 196)
 Huang Zu, Chinese general and administrator
 Hua Tuo, Chinese physician and surgeon (b. 140)
 Kong Rong, Chinese warlord and politician (b. 153)
 Liu Biao, Chinese governor and warlord (b. 142)
 Liu Fu, Chinese governor and politician 
 Vologases V, king of the Parthian Empire

References